Valentine's Day is an Australian comedy film made in 2007 by the Australian Broadcasting Corporation with support of Film Victoria. Directed by Martin McGrath, it was first shown on TV on 6 July 2008. The main character, Ben Valentine (played by Rhys Muldoon), visits the small Victorian country town of Rushworth and is mistaken for a champion footballer of the same name. The canny local magistrate sentences him to 200 hours of community service, to be served coaching the town's team, the Bears.

Film Genre
This film is produced in Australia and it falls under the genre of comedy and drama. As according to Sydney Morning Herald.

Cast
 Rhys Muldoon as Ben Valentine
 Adam Zwar as Beak
 Marley Sharp as Luke Kennedy
 Roy Billing as Kevin Flynn
 Virginia and Peter Brown as extras
 Amelia Vernal as an extra

References

External links
 

2008 television films
2008 films
2000s English-language films
2000s sports comedy films
Valentine's Day in films
Australian sports comedy films
Australian rules football films
Films directed by Peter Duncan
2000s Australian films